Kangashi (also Romanized as Kangāshī) is a village in Bakhtegan Rural District, Abadeh Tashk District, Neyriz County, Fars Province, Iran. At the 2006 census, its population was 160, in 44 families.

References 

Populated places in Abadeh Tashk County